Iothia is a genus of sea snails, the true limpets, marine gastropod mollusks in the family Lepetidae.

Species
The following species within the genus Iothia are recognised by the World Register of Marine Species :<ref name=Genus>{{cite WoRMS |author=Gofas, Serge |year=2015 |title='IothiaForbes, 1849 |id=138110 |accessdate=15 August 2017|db=}}</ref>Iothia albescens (Philippi, 1846) (nomen dubium)Iothia emarginuloides (Philippi, 1868) Iothia fulva (O. F. Müller, 1776)Iothia lindbergi McLean, 1985Iothia megalodon Warén, Nakano & Sellanes, 2011
Species brought into synonymy
 Iothia antarctica (E. A. Smith, 1907): synonym of Iothia emarginuloides (Philippi, 1868)
 Iothia coppingeri (E. A. Smith, 1881): synonym of Iothia emarginuloides (Philippi, 1868)
 Iothia depressa (Hedley, 1916): synonym of Nacella polaris (Hombron & Jacquinot, 1841): synonym of Nacella concinna (Strebel, 1908)
 Iothia fulviformis (Egorova, 1972): synonym of Iothia emarginuloides (Philippi, 1868)
 Iothia pelseneeri (Thiele, 1912): synonym of Propilidium pelseneeri Thiele, 1912
 Iothia radiata (M. Sars, 1851): synonym of Piliscus commodus (Middendorff, 1851)

References

 Forbes, E. 1849. On the genera of British Patellacea.'' The Athenaeum 1145: 1018
 Gofas, S.; Le Renard, J.; Bouchet, P. (2001). Mollusca. in: Costello, M.J. et al. (eds), European Register of Marine Species: a check-list of the marine species in Europe and a bibliography of guides to their identification. Patrimoines Naturels. 50: 180-213
 Spencer, H.G., Marshall, B.A. & Willan, R.C. (2009). Checklist of New Zealand living Mollusca. Pp 196–219. in: Gordon, D.P. (ed.) New Zealand inventory of biodiversity. Volume one. Kingdom Animalia: Radiata, Lophotrochozoa, Deuterostomia. Canterbury University Press, Christchurch.
 

Lepetidae